André Stassart (born 29 September 1937) is a Belgian footballer. He played in five matches for the Belgium national football team from 1967 to 1971.

References

External links
 

1937 births
Living people
Belgian footballers
Belgium international footballers
Place of birth missing (living people)
Association footballers not categorized by position